Lake Parón is the largest lake in the Cordillera Blanca, on the Peruvian Andes, 32 km E from the city Caraz, at 4185 m asl.

It is nested and surrounded by several snow peaks such as Aguja I 5,840 m, Aguja II 5m888 m, Aguja III 5,775 m, Caraz I 6,025 m, Qaras II 6,020 m, Qaras III 5,720 m, Artesonraju 6,025 m, Parón 5,600 m, Pirámide 5,885 m, Chacraraju W 6,112 m, Chacraraju E 6,001 m, Pisco 5,772 m, Huandoy E 6000 m, Huandoy N 6395 m and Huandoy W 6,356 m. It is one of the most popular areas for climbing in Peru, including the so famous The Sphinx 5325m, a granite monolith, offering at least 13 big wall routes.

The lake, formed as a natural moraine reservoir, has a catchment area of 44.3 km², it is 3.7 km long (E-W) and average of 700 m width (N-S), the original depth was about 75 m, but today the level was lowered ca. 15 m to prevent the collapse of the moraine. The water from the lake was formerly used for the Cañón del Pato hydroelectric scheme, since 29 July 2008, this condition has ceased. The lake itself is within the borders of the Huascarán National Park. The water level is controlled by a tunnel and underwater gate, to keep water level at 4,155 m asl aiming a double objective: to prevent the overflow and the resulting risk for the downstream population and to manage the river discharge.

The high concentrations of dissolved lime give the water of Lake Parón a turquoise color.

It is a popular day hike for those willing to acclimatize or even ride a mountain bike downhill (note: there's almost a 2,000 m drop to Caraz). It is possible to camp on the west and east shores, and from the east end, an easy walk can lead to the impressive pyramid or Artesonraju (the Paramount Picture's logo).

Lakes of Peru
Lakes of Ancash Region
Huascarán National Park